The Shōnan–Shinjuku Line is a passenger railway service in Japan which commenced in December 2001. The line has no dedicated track as services run through shared sections along the Ryōmō Line, Takasaki Line, Utsunomiya Line, Yamanote freight line, Yokosuka Line, and Tōkaidō Main Line. It is treated as a distinct service at stations and on railway maps.

Services
Service patterns on the Shōnan–Shinjuku Line are as follows:

Utsunomiya Line–Yokosuka Line route
 Shōnan–Shinjuku Line local (Utsunomiya Line: local; Ōmiya–Ōfuna: local; Yokosuka Line: local)
 Services commenced on December 1, 2001.
 Most trains are operated in 15-car sets. Some pause at Koganei to couple-up or divide, with the 10-car portion continues northward; others are operated in 10-car sets along the entire line.
E233 series LED Displays show a green colour  for this service.
 Shōnan–Shinjuku Line local / Shōnan–Shinjuku Line rapid (Utsunomiya Line: Rapid; Ōmiya–Ōfuna: Local; Yokosuka Line: Local)
 Services commenced on October 16, 2004.
 From morning to midday, trains are operated hourly between Utsunomiya and Zushi (some to/from Ōfuna). Trains operate as rapid services within the Utsunomiya Line and as local services within the Yokosuka Line. These services replace daytime Rabbit rapid trains within the Utsunomiya Line to/from Ueno.
 Most trains are operated in 15-car sets. Some pause at Koganei to couple-up or divide, with the 10-car portion is operated north of Koganei; others are operated in 10-car sets along the entire line.

Takasaki Line–Tōkaidō Line route
 Shōnan–Shinjuku Line local / Shōnan–Shinjuku Line rapid (Takasaki Line: Local; Ōmiya–Totsuka: Rapid; Totsuka–Tōkaidō Line: Local)
 Services commenced on December 1, 2001.
 Except for a single northbound morning and southbound evening train, all trains are operated in 15-car sets south of Kagohara, where they are joined/separated; a 10-car train is operated north of Kagohara. The train from Fukaya is operated as a 15-car set.
E233 series LED Displays show an orange colour  between Ōmiya and Totsuka, and a green colour  within the Takasaki and Tōkaidō Lines for this service.
 Shōnan–Shinjuku Line special rapid (Takasaki Line–Ōmiya–Ōfuna–Tōkaidō Line: Special Rapid)
 Services commenced on October 16, 2004.
 One train per hour is operated throughout the day. This service replaces Urban rapid services to/from Ueno within the Takasaki Line. Except for the first northbound train, which starts from Hiratsuka, all trains are operated between Takasaki and Odawara.
 Except for two round trips on weekdays, all trains are operated in 15-car sets south of Kagohara, where they are joined/separated; a 10-car train is operated north of Kagohara.
E233 series LED Displays show a blue colour  for this service.

Station list 
 Trains stop at stations marked "●" and pass those marked "｜".
 For information on Limited Express services, see the Shōnan article.

Notes

Rolling stock
 E231-1000 series
 E233-3000 series (since March 2015)
Initially, services were operated using a mixture of rolling stock, including 115 series, 211 series, 215 series (double-deck), E217 series, and E231-1000 series EMUs, but rolling stock was standardized on the E231-1000 series EMUs in 2004, from which date these trains also included two bilevel Green cars. From the start of the new timetable on 14 March 2015, E233-3000 series trainsets were also introduced on Shonan–Shinjuku Line services.

History 
On 20 August 2016, station numbering was introduced with stations being assigned station numbers between JS05 and JS24. Numbers increase towards in the northbound direction towards Omiya.

See also
 Ueno-Tokyo Line, a similar north-south line running through the east side of central Tokyo
 F Liner, a competitor to the Shonan-Shinjuku Line between Ikebukuro / Shinjuku / Shibuya to Yokohama.
 Utsunomiya Line
 Tohoku Main Line
 Takasaki Line

References

Further reading

External links

 Shōnan–Shinjuku line (Japan guide) 

Lines of East Japan Railway Company
Rail transport in Tochigi Prefecture
Rail transport in Gunma Prefecture
Rail transport in Saitama Prefecture
Railway lines in Tokyo
Railway lines in Kanagawa Prefecture
Railway lines opened in 2001
1067 mm gauge railways in Japan
2001 establishments in Japan